Song Wusao (fl. 1179), was a Chinese restaurant owner. 

She fled from Kaifeng when it was taken by the Jurchen in 1126 and settled in the new capital of Hangzhou, where she founded a net of restaurants and was eventually favored by Emperor Gaozong of Song with providing the imperial court with fish, which made her famous and rich. Her famous fish soup became a traditional dish in Hangzhou, and she is also said to be the inventor of the dish vinegar fish famed by the restaurant Louwalou.

References 
 Lily Xiao Hong Lee, Sue Wiles: Biographical Dictionary of Chinese Women, volume II: Tang Through Ming 618 - 1644
12th-century Chinese women
12th-century Chinese people
12th-century merchants
Medieval businesswomen